Weisbrod or Weisbrodt is a German surname that may refer to the following people:
Brooke Weisbrod, American sportscaster and college basketball analyst
Burton Weisbrod (born 1931), American economist 
Esther Charlotte Emily Weisbrodt Francis (1836–1913), German-American Mormon pioneer
John Weisbrod (born 1968), American ice hockey player and manager
Jörn Weisbrodt (born 26 1973), German arts administrator
Jonathan Weisbrod, American film producer and screenwriter
Wolfgang Weisbrod-Weber, United Nations Secretary-General's Special Representative

See also
Pueblo Weisbrod Aircraft Museum in Colorado, U.S.

German-language surnames